Edwarsia is an unaccepted scientific name and may refer to two different genera:
 Bidens, a genus of plants
 Edwardsia, a genus of sea anemones